TLI may refer to:

 Thallium(I) iodide, a Thallium compound
 Transport Layer Interface, a networking application programming interface.
 Trans-lunar injection, a propulsive maneuver used to set a spacecraft on a trajectory which will arrive at the Moon.
 Tseng Laboratories, Inc., the full corporate name of Tseng Labs
 Tall Latte index, an economic index based on the cost of a cup of Starbucks coffee
 Taipei Language Institute, an institute for teaching Mandarin Chinese founded in 1956
 The Lonely Island, an American comedy troupe
The Living Infinite
 Trophic level index, an index used in New Zealand for measuring the nutrient content of a lake
 Term Life Insurance
 Temporal light interference, undesired degradation or malfunction of an equipment or system caused by light modulations